Tongshanjiabu is a mountain in the Himalayas. It sits in the disputed border territory between Bhutan and China. Tongshanjiabu has never been officially climbed.

The name "Tongshanjiabu" is indicated on a map from the Japanese Alpine News, May 2003, p. 44. The region's highpoint is sometimes given as "Teri Kang", but this appears to be the name of a subsidiary top.

See also
Mountains of Bhutan
List of Ultras of the Himalayas

References

External links
 "Himalaya of Nepal, Bhutan, Sikkim and adjoining region of Tibet" on Peaklist

Mountains of Bhutan
Mountains of Tibet
International mountains of Asia
Bhutan–China border
Seven-thousanders of the Himalayas